Craspedodiscus is a genus of diatoms in the family Coscinodiscaceae.

References

External links

Coscinodiscophyceae genera